Obitel Peninsula is the mostly ice-covered peninsula wide 6.9 km and indenting for 6.6 km northwestwards between Hamburg Bay and Perrier Bay on the northwest coast of Anvers Island in the Palmer Archipelago, Antarctica.  It ends up in Bonnier Point to the west and Giard Point to the north.

The peninsula is named after the settlement of Obitel in Northeastern Bulgaria.

Location
British mapping in 1980.

Maps
 British Antarctic Territory.  Scale 1:200000 topographic map.  DOS 610 Series, Sheet W 64 62.  Directorate of Overseas Surveys, UK, 1980.
 Antarctic Digital Database (ADD). Scale 1:250000 topographic map of Antarctica. Scientific Committee on Antarctic Research (SCAR). Since 1993, regularly upgraded and updated.

References
 Bulgarian Antarctic Gazetteer. Antarctic Place-names Commission. (details in Bulgarian, basic data in English)
 Obitel Peninsula. SCAR Composite Antarctic Gazetteer.

External links
 Obitel Peninsula. Adjusted Copernix satellite image

Peninsulas of Graham Land
Landforms of the Palmer Archipelago
Bulgaria and the Antarctic